Cetus Hill is a large ice-covered mound which comes to a point with three jagged rock peaks at its west end. It was named by the UK Antarctic Place-Names Committee after the constellation of Cetus.

References 

Hills of Palmer Land